Tigharry is a small village on the west of North Uist. It is mostly a farming community. There are a few rocky beaches and one point of interest is Kettle's Cave. Tigharry is within the parish of North Uist and used to have its own chapel, known as St. Clement's and dating from prior to 1654.

References

External links

Canmore - North Uist, Tigharry site record
Canmore - North Uist, Tigharry, Cist site record
Canmore - North Uist, Tigharry, Sithean Eaval site record

Villages on North Uist